"On My Way" is a song released by Dutch DJ and record producer Tiësto on January 13, 2017 via Musical Freedom. The song featured English duo Bright Sparks.

Reacts and reviews 
Ruben from French webmedia Guettapen points out the plagiarism practicised by Tiësto to produce the track: "Tiësto hasn't hesitated to take up the main idea of the track 'This Girl' of Kungs and Cookin' on 3 Burners. If only the Dutchman had bothered to edit entirely the melody and the notes of the Frenchman... No way! A beautiful cut, copy, and paste in all its gorgeousness."

Kungs himself reacted to the release of the track on Twitter: "I'm flattered to see that many people think I produced the new Tiësto's track... It's not the case but good track."

Music video
The music video of the song was released on February 9, 2017. A total of seven international YouTube stars, including Werevertumorro, RCLBeauty101, Dagi Bee, Hikakin, Seikin, Royal Stampede, and LubaTV, were starred in the music video and was heading to Tiësto's performance at Hakkasan Nightclub in Las Vegas, on January 14, 2017.

Track listing

Personnel
Credits adapted from Tidal.
 Tiësto – production
 Bright Sparks – vocals
 Ashley Hicklin – production
 Sergio Popken – engineering, mixing
 Addy van der Zwan – master engineering

Charts

Weekly charts

Year-end charts

Release history

See also
 List of number-one singles of 2017 (Poland)

References

2017 singles
2017 songs
Tiësto songs
Number-one singles in Poland
Songs written by Tiësto
Songs written by Ashley Hicklin